Matthew Ball may refer to:

Matthew Ball (footballer) (born 1982), Australian rules footballer
Matthew Ball (dancer) (born 1993), British dancer